Eshkaft-e Qateri Murzard (also Romanized as Eshkaft-e Qāţerī Mūrzard; also known as Eshgaft-e Qāţerī) is a village in Margown Rural District, Margown District, Boyer-Ahmad County, Kohgiluyeh and Boyer-Ahmad Province, Iran. At the 2006 census, its population was 106, in 22 families.

References 

Populated places in Boyer-Ahmad County